Rick's Brewery, also known as Minnie Creek Brewery and Old Brewery, is a historic building located west of Anamosa, Iowa, United States.  John Kohl bought the property in 1858, and he joined with John B. Kraus and Wilhelm Romberg to build the initial part of the building the following year.  The three-story structure was built of native limestone that was quarried  to the west.  It was built into the side of a hill so each level has a ground level entrance.  They operated Minnie Creek Brewery here until 1863 when the building was sold at a sheriff's sale to satisfy a judgment against the partners.  Abram B. Head bought it and sold the building the next year to Michael F. Rick who operated the brewery for 13 years and expanded the building to its present size.  Rick also lost the building in a sheriff's sale in 1878 to satisfy a judgement against him.  From 1882 to 1894 Iowa went through is first period of prohibition and it is not certain whether the building has housed a brewery since.  It has subsequently been transformed into a residence.  The building was listed on the National Register of Historic Places in 1999.

References

Industrial buildings completed in 1872
Buildings and structures in Jones County, Iowa
National Register of Historic Places in Jones County, Iowa
Industrial buildings and structures on the National Register of Historic Places in Iowa
1872 establishments in Iowa